Cape Nansen is a headland in the Greenland Sea, east Greenland, Sermersooq municipality. This cape is named after Fridtjof Nansen. Cape Nansen is an important geographical landmark.

Geography
Cape Nansen is located to the northeast of the mouth of the Nansen Fjord in an indented area of the eastern Greenland coast where there is a succession of headlands with active glaciers in between. The cape lies 15 km to the east-northeast of the mighty Cape J.A.D. Jensen on Sokongen Island 

This headland has been defined by the International Hydrographic Organization as the Southwest limit of the Greenland Sea, which is a line joining Cape Nansen with Straumnes, Iceland, the NW point of Iceland.

References

External links
 Cape Nansen, Greenland

Headlands of Greenland